INSAT-4A was the first one in the INSAT-4 Satellites series, providing services in the Ku and C band frequency bands. At the time of launch, it was the heaviest satellite India had produced. The Ku transponders cover the Indian main land and C-Band transponders cover an extended area. It has a dozen Ku transponders and another dozen of C-band transponders. This spacecraft was placed at 83°E along with INSAT-2E and INSAT-3B, by Ariane launch vehicle (ARIANE5-V169).

Overview 
INSAT-4A was a communication satellite intended for providing high quality television, telecommunication, broadcasting services and was the first satellite to be launched in the INSAT-4 series.

Launch 
INSAT-4A was launched by an Ariane 5, produced by Arianespace, on 21 Dec 2005 at 22.33 UTC from Kourou, French Guiana. It was placed into a Geosynchronous Transfer Orbit (GTO), 30 minutes after lift-off in 3-axis stabilized mode, with a perigee of 859 km and an apogee of 36,055 km. Its co-passenger on board was Meteosat-9 of EUMETSAT.

Payload 
12 Ku band transponders. It was being used by Tata Sky.
12 C-band transponders

End Of Life and Replacement
The satellite was placed in the graveyard orbit on 21 October 2019 after almost 14 years in service. A replacement satellite GSAT-30 was launched on 21:05 UTC, 16 January 2020 aboard Ariane 5 VA251.

References 

Spacecraft launched in 2005
Communications satellites in geostationary orbit
INSAT satellites
2005 in India